Apeiba intermedia is a species of flowering plant in the family Malvaceae sensu lato or in Tiliaceae or Sparrmanniaceae family.
It is found only in Suriname.

References

intermedia
Flora of Suriname
Data deficient plants
Taxonomy articles created by Polbot